This is a list of episodes from the tenth season of Shark Tank.

Episodes

Guest sharks for this season, subtitled "A Decade of Dreams," include Jamie Siminoff, the first guest shark to have sought a deal on the show (the sharks passed on his company Doorbot, now known as Ring).

References

External links 
 Official website
 

10
2018 American television seasons
2019 American television seasons